Talovsky is a rural locality (a khutor) in Novokiyevskoye Rural Settlement, Novoanninsky District, Volgograd Oblast, Russia. The population was 10 as of 2010.

Geography 
Talovsky is located in forest steppe on the Khopyorsko-Buzulukskaya Plain, 49 km southeast of Novoanninsky (the district's administrative centre) by road. Novokiyevka is the nearest rural locality.

References 

Rural localities in Novoanninsky District